World Elephant Day is an international annual event on August 12, dedicated to the preservation and protection of the world's elephants. Conceived in 2011 by Canadian filmmakers Patricia Sims and Michael Clark of Canazwest Pictures, and Sivaporn Dardarananda, Secretary-General of the Elephant Reintroduction Foundation in Thailand, it was officially founded, supported and launched by Patricia Sims and the Elephant Reintroduction Foundation on August 12, 2012. Since that time, Patricia Sims continues to lead, support and direct World Elephant Day, which is now recognized and celebrated by over 100 wildlife organizations and many individuals in countries across the globe.

Mission 

The goal of World Elephant Day is to create awareness of the urgent plight of African and Asian elephants, and to share knowledge and positive solutions for the better care and management of captive and wild elephants. African elephants are listed as "Vulnerable" and Asian elephants as "Endangered" on the IUCN Red List of threatened species. One conservationist has stated that both African and Asian elephants face extinction within twelve years.  The current population estimates are about 400,000 for African elephants and 40,000 for Asian elephants, although it has been argued that these numbers are much too high.

History 

The first World Elephant Day was held on August 12, 2012. The film Return to the Forest, narrated by William Shatner, is about the reintroduction of captive Asian elephants to the wild and was released on the inaugural World Elephant Day. The follow-up feature film When Elephants Were Young, also narrated by Shatner, depicts the life of a young man and young elephant in Thailand.

Issues

Poaching 

The demand for ivory, which is highest in China, leads to the illegal poaching of both African and Asian elephants. For example, one of the world's largest elephants, Satao, was recently killed for his iconic tusks. Another iconic Kenyan elephant, Mountain Bull, was also killed by poachers, and with the street value for ivory now exceeding that of gold, African elephants face a poaching epidemic. Elephants are also poached for meat, leather, and body parts, with the illegal wildlife trade putting elephants increasingly in danger, because it is perceived to be a low risk and high profit endeavor. Poachers are often considered trained for this activity due to the amount of tools needed to be transported as well as the large size of these animals.

Habitat loss 

The loss of habitat due to deforestation, increases in mining, and agricultural activities has become problematic, especially for Asian elephants. The fragmentation of habitat also creates isolation – this makes breeding more difficult, and allows poachers to find the elephants and set traps more easily. Asian elephants have lost nearly 30-40% of their habitat, making it incredibly difficult to maintain their offspring and themselves.

Human-elephant conflict 

Human-elephant conflict is a significant concern, as human populations increase and forest cover decreases, forcing elephants into close proximity with human settlements. Incidents include crop damage and economic losses, as well as both elephant and human casualties.

Mistreatment in captivity 

A lack of legislation regarding the care and treatment of elephants in zoos, circuses, and tourism often leads to their mistreatment. Captivity can be a serious threat to elephants, and Asian elephants are often illegally captured in the wild and trafficked into the lucrative tourism industry.

Celebrity voices 
Many notable celebrities have spoken out about the urgency of elephant protection, including Leonardo DiCaprio, Kristin Davis, William Shatner, Yao Ming, Prince William, Jorja Fox, Alec Baldwin, Stephen Fry, Ashley Judd, Jada Pinkett Smith, Kathryn Bigelow, and politicians such as Barack Obama, and Hillary and Chelsea Clinton.

See also 
 List of environmental dates

References

External links 
 

August observances
Elephant conservation
Environmental awareness days
International observances